Akagi means (赤城) "red castle," (赤木) "red tree," or (赤来) "red future" in the Japanese language, and may refer to:

 Akagi, Gunma, a village in Gunma Prefecture
 Akagi, Shimane (赤来町), a former town in Shimane Prefecture
 Akagi (manga), a manga by Nobuyuki Fukumoto
 Akagi (surname), a Japanese surname
 Akagi (train), a train service in Japan
 "Akagi", a song performed by Maximum the Hormone
 One of two ships of the Imperial Japanese Navy:
 Japanese gunboat Akagi, which served in the Sino-Japanese War
 Japanese aircraft carrier Akagi, which served in World War II
 Mount Akagi, a mountain in the Kantō region of Japan